Individual (stylized in all caps) is the debut extended play (EP) by American duo singers and actresses Niki & Gabi, released on July 27, 2018. The EP features six original tracks composed and produced mainly by Lyre, most of which have a EDM pop sound. The EP charted at No. 14 on the Heatseekers Albums chart and No. 32 on the Independent Albums chart in Billboard Magazine.

Background 
The duo began creating the EP in 2016, and in 2017, it was announced that Niki & Gabi were releasing a project in November 2017. They confirmed that it was going be an EP with five original tracks. The release date was later changed to July 27, 2018, and it was confirmed it would have six tracks. The EP got its name because both Niki & Gabi wanted to reflect their differences and show people that they are two different people, despite being twins. The EP has retro/pop vibes. The EP took two years to complete. Both Niki & Gabi had one solo track on the EP to show their differences in music, Niki's being her debut single "Let It Roar" and Gabi's single being "Flowers", the follow-up to her debut single "Ever After".

Singles and music videos 
The lead single "RU" was released on August 11, 2017, alongside its music video, as of 2021, the music video reached more than 14 million views on YouTube. the second single "Sleep It Off" was released on June 29, 2018, and the music video was announced to be released after it hit 100k streams on Spotify. After it reached that number, the music video was released on July 9, 2018. The double third singles "Flowers" by Gabi and "Let It Roar" by Niki were released on July 13, 2018, as their solo singles from the EP, there music videos followed on July 20 and July 25, 2018, the music video for "Flowers" features cameo from Paris Hilton. 

The tracks "Out From Under You" and "Make It Sting" received lyric videos, the lyric video for "Out From Under You" was released two days after the EP was released, and the lyric video for "Make It Sting" was released on November 21, 2018, as a Christmas gift from the twins.

Composition 
Gabi said that The tracks are standby how they felt as young adults – their emotions, the relationships or the beginning of one or the end of one, and who they are as music artists. and it's just like the perfect combination of who they are today mixed with who they are musically, who they've been musically their whole lives if she had to go back 00RemakeGirls days and be like "okay, if you had an album what would it sound like? It would sound like Individual".

Tour 
On July 3, 2018, Niki & Gabi announced the Individual Tour in support of the EP. The tour was scheduled to begin on August 4, 2018, in San Francisco, California, however, due to unforeseen circumstances only the final date of the tour, December 27, 2018, was performed.

Chart performance

Track listing

Notes 
There are two songs that were intended to be on the EP which are "Cold Room" a solo single by Gabi and "Hair Tie" that both were later released in 2019.

Personnel 

 Gabi DeMartino – vocals , songwriting 
 Niki DeMar – vocals 
 Alina Smith – production 
 Elli Moore – production , songwriter 
 Nathan Cunningham – production , songwriting 
 Marc Sibley – production , songwriting 
 Stephanie Jones – production , songwriting 
 Brandon Campbell – production , songwriting

References 

2018 debut EPs
Niki and Gabi albums